Camilo Sabio (born June 16, 1936) is a public lawyer and past chairman of the Philippines'  Presidential Commission on Good Government. He previously held the position of Secretary-General in the Philippine House of Representatives from 1992 to 1998 under Jose de Venecia.

Early life
Sabio earned his Bachelor of Arts degree from Xavier University – Ateneo de Cagayan as valedictorian
with a gold medal for academic excellence. He finished his Bachelor of Laws from the Ateneo de Manila University also as valedictorian with gold medal for academic excellence. Joined the Law Firm of Feria, Manglapus & Associates. He was professor, Political Law, Constitutional Law, Administrative Law, and International Law in the Ateneo de Manila Law School.

Politics
Sabio was Davao delegate to the 1971 Constitutional Convention. For 20 years, he served as Chief Counsel of the Federation of Free Farmers (FFF) and of the Federation of Free Workers (FFW). He served as Chief of Staff of the Presidential Assistant for Legal Affairs, Office of the President. Later he worked as Chief of Staff of the Senior Associate Justice Jose Y. Feria. He was Secretary General (unanimously elected for three terms), and, concurrently Chief Counsel and Chief Parliamentarian of the House of Representatives.

In the 1998 elections, Sabio ran for the position of Vice President as a running mate of lottery company manager Manuel Morato under the Partido Bansang Marangal (National Dignity Party). He however lost to Senator Gloria Macapagal Arroyo. He served as president of the Philippine Constitutional Association (PhilConsA) from 1998 to 2002. He was appointed by President Gloria Macapagal Arroyo as chairman of the PCGG in 2005 when its previous chairperson, Haydee Yorac died of ovarian cancer and took his oath May 2, 2005.

Conviction and other controversies 
In 2012, the Office of the Ombudsman found Sabio guilty of grave misconduct for attempting to influence his younger brother, Court of Appeals (CA) Associate Justice Jose Sabio Jr., in the GSIS-Meralco bribery case.

In June 2017, Camilo Sabio was found guilty of two counts of graft by the Sandiganbayan First Division and sentenced to 12 to 20 years imprisonment for alleged anomalous lease of vehicles in 2007 and 2009. In September 2017, the National Bureau of Investigation arrested Sabio over charges of graft, malversation of funds and corrupt practices.

References

External links
Philippine Commission on Good Government

Place of birth missing (living people)
1941 births
Heads of government agencies of the Philippines
Candidates in the 1998 Philippine vice-presidential election
Living people
Partido Bansang Marangal politicians
Arroyo administration personnel
Xavier University – Ateneo de Cagayan alumni
Ateneo de Manila University alumni